Podsednik may refer to:
Scott Podsednik, former professional baseball player for Major League Baseball
Lisa Dergan Podsednik, wife of Scott Podsednik